Ben Bull (born May 1873) was an English footballer who played as a midfielder. Bull made one appearance for Liverpool during his career, where he replaced regular winger Malcolm McVean for a match against Lincoln City and the second goal in a 6–1 victory. He made no further appearances for the club when McVean returned.

References

1873 births
English Football League players
English footballers
Liverpool F.C. players
Year of death missing
Association football midfielders